The Chulitna River is the name of two rivers in Alaska:

Chulitna River (Susitna River), a 70 mile long tributary of the Susitna River.
Chulitna River (Lake Clark), a 90 mile long tributary of Lake Clark.

See also
List of Alaska rivers